Uno Kajak (9 May 1933 – 10 August 2019) was an Estonian skier. He competed in the Nordic combined event at the 1956 Winter Olympics.

Kajak graduated in 1948 from Rakvere Elementary School No. 2. In 1956 he graduated from Tartu State University (now the University of Tartu), having studied physical education.

References

External links
 

1933 births
2019 deaths
Estonian male Nordic combined skiers
Estonian male biathletes
Olympic Nordic combined skiers of the Soviet Union
Nordic combined skiers at the 1956 Winter Olympics
Sportspeople from Tartu
University of Tartu alumni